Calliostoma aequisculptum is a species of sea snail, a marine gastropod mollusk in the family Calliostomatidae.

Description
The length of the shell varies between 10 mm and 25 mm.

Distribution
This marine shell occurs in the Pacific Ocean from Mazatlan, Mexico to Peru

References

External links
 To Biodiversity Heritage Library (1 publication)
 To Encyclopedia of Life
 To USNM Invertebrate Zoology Mollusca Collection
 To World Register of Marine Species
 

aequisculptum
Gastropods described in 1865